Sree Padmanabhadasa Sree Uthradom Thirunal Marthanda Varma (22 March 1922 – 16 December 2013) was the titular Maharaja of Travancore. He was the younger brother of the last ruling monarch of the Kingdom of Travancore, Maharajah Chithira Thirunal Balarama Varma.

Named Heir Apparent from birth, as per the Travancore matrilineal law of succession, he joined the firm of Plymouth and Company at Bangalore in 1952, working there as a clerk and truck driver briefly to study the functioning of industries at a basic level. He was the Chief Scout of the regional Boy Scout troop, and is also a patron of local hospitals and charities.

He married the daughter of Lt. Col. Krishnan Gopinathan Pandalai, the sometime Supt. of the Government General Hospital, Madras, namely Ammachi Panapillai Amma Shrimati Radhadevi Pandalai and has a son, Ananthapadmanabhan Thampi and a daughter, Parvathidevi Kochamma. He resided at Pattom Palace, Trivandrum until his death in 2013.

Early life

Sree Uthradom Thirunal was the youngest son of H.H queen mother Sethu Parvathi Bayi of Travancore by her consort, Ravi Varma Kochu Koyi Thampuran of Kilimanoor Royal House, a Sanskrit scholar and the great-nephew of the celebrated painter, Raja Ravi Varma. He was born on 22 March 1922 in Travancore. His siblings were Chithira Thirunal Balarama Varma and Karthika Thirunal Lakshmi Bayi. His mother, Sethu Parvathi Bayi, was distantly related, by birth, to the Travancore Royal Family in the direct female line. In 1900, following the absence of heirs in the Travancore Royal Family, she had been adopted by her maternal great-aunt, Maharani Lakshmi Bayi. According to the matrilineal traditions of the Travancore Royal Family, Sree Uthradom Thirunal, at the time of his birth, was proclaimed the Heir Apparent of Travancore with the title of : Sree Padmanabhadasa Maharajkumar Sree Marthanda Varma, Elaya Rajah (Crown Prince) of Travancore.

Sree Uthradom Thirunal was educated privately by a group of 14 tutors in various subjects. He later graduated from the then Travancore University with Economics, Politics and History as specialisations in 1943. He was the recipient of the Moncombu Aandi Iyer Gold Medal for the best student in Sanskrit from the varsity. He was respected for his erudition.

Titular Maharajah of Travancore

Sree Uthradom Thirunal became head of the Travancore royal family after his elder brother and the last monarch of Travancore Sree Chithira Thirunal Balarama Varma died in 1991. As a titular Maharaja, Uthradom Thirunal had no real administrative power but was a popular figure in Travancore, and had daily ceremonial engagements. He also maintained his ritual position at the Padmanabhaswamy Temple as the custodian of the temple, and was involved in events relating to this. On the discovery of the immense wealth in the vaults of Sree Padmanabha Swamy Temple in Thiruvananthapuram, the family shrine of Travancore royals, Uthradom Tirunal stated: "It has been in the temple vaults for centuries and the royal family has been well aware of that. It is the wealth of Lord Padmanabha and we have never ever felt any interest in it. It should be preserved as God's wealth in future also." Uthradom Thirunal Marthanda Varma successor is Sree Padmanabhadasa Sree Moolam Thirunal Rama Varma his nephew and second son of Sree Padmanabhasevini Maharani Karthika Thirunal Lakshmi Bayi of Travancore and her husband Lt. Col. G. V. Raja.

Community involvement

Trustee and "Dasa" of Sree Padmanabhaswamy Temple
Patron-in-Chief Thiruvananthapuram Kendra Bharatiya Vidya Bhavan
Chief Scout Travancore Boy Scouts Assoc, Travancore-Cochin Boy Scouts Assoc and Kerala Boy Scouts Assoc. 
Chief Patron Sneham Super Speciality Hospital Project
Patron Sri Swati Thirunal Sangita Sabha since 1991
Patron Shree Uthradom Tirunal Hospital (SUT)
Patron Muthalamada Sneham Charitable Trust
Patron Trivandrum Tennis Club (TTC) since 1938
Patron Trivandrum Club
Patron Trivandrum Friend-in-Need Soc
Patron Ananthapuram Non-Resident's Association (ANORA)

Personal life

Sree Uthradom Thirunal joined the firm of Plymouth and Company at Bangalore in 1952, working there and also studying the functioning of industries at a basic level. He was the Chief Scout of the regional Boy Scout troop, and was also a patron of local hospitals and charities. He married Ammachi Panapillai Amma Srimathi Radhadevi Pandalai of Kayamkulam, daughter of Lieutenant-Colonel Krishnan Gopinathan Pandalai.  He has a son, Ananthapadmanabhan Thampi and a daughter, Parvathi Devi Thankachi. Uthradom Thirunal resided at Pattom Palace, Trivandrum. 

A vegetarian and teetotaller, he only drank milk. He won several trophies as an amateur horse rider. He played tennis, hockey, golf, football and polo. He learned photography in 1934 when his brother Sree Chithira Thirunal Bala Rama Varma Maharaja gave him a Rolleiflex camera, and built up a collection of about 5,000 negatives. He drove a lot, and won several medals from the Benz company at Stuttgart.

Death

Sree Uthradom Thirunal was hospitalised in early December 2013 following gastrointestinal bleeding. He died of cardiac arrest at a private hospital in Thiruvananthapuram on 16 December 2013. He died during the Murajapam Ceremony in the Padmanabhaswamy Temple which he had organised . The state government declared a public holiday on 16 December as a mark of respect to him. Though Sree Uthradom Thirunal was the Titular Maharajah, the people called him 'Thampuran' and 'Thirumanassu' (lord or His Highness) with high esteem. Sree Uthradom Thirunal attended all cultural programmes in the Capital City of Thiruvananthapuram and escorted Sree Padmanabha his family deity twice a year for Arattu procession. His wife, Ammachi Panapillai Amma Srimathi Radhadevi Pandalai predeceased him in 1993. He is survived by his two children, Ananthapadmanabhan Thampi and Parvathi Devi Kochamma.

Successor
With the demise of Uthradom Thirunal, Moolam Thirunal Rama Varma became the titular Maharajah of Travancore and Revathi Thirunal Balagopal Varma, the titular Elayarajah.

Titles

1922–1991: His Highness Maharajkumar Sree Marthanda Varma, Elaya Raja of Travancore
1991–2013: His Highness Lt. Col Sree Padmanabhadasa Sree Uthradom Thirunal Marthanda Varma Maharaja of Travancore Titular

Honours

King George V Silver Jubilee Medal, 1935
King George VI Coronation Medal, 1937
Indian Independence Medal, 1947

Military Appointments

 Colonel Travancore University Labour Corps
 Lt. Col in The Nair Brigade (State Army of Travancore ,.Madras Regiment) and (Travancore-Cochin State Forces)
 Honorary Lt. Colonel in the Indian Army

Biography

Mathrubhumi Books released a book named Thrippadi Daanam written by Uma Maheshwari featuring the biography of Uthradom Thirunal Marthanda Varma. The book starts from the year 925 ME (1750 AD) when the Travancore King Anizham Thirunal Veerabaala Marthanda Varma surrendered his country to Sree Padmanabha through an act referred to as Thrippadi Daanam. The book also covers art- cultural lifestyle of Travancore rulers and gives a personal account about his elder brother & sovereign, Sree Chithira Thirunal Balarama Varma.

See also

 G. V. Raja
 Travancore Royal Family
 Maharajah
 Thampi
 Panapillai Amma

References

External links

In Conversation With His Highness Uthradam Thirunal Marthanda, Youtube.com. Accessed 18 January 2023.
Laxmi Ajai Prasanna, TNN "Thousands pay their last tribute to Uthradom Thirunal Marthanda Varma", timesofindia.indiatimes.com. 6 December 2013.
Profile, Outlookindia.com. Accessed 18 January 2023.
Thrippadi Danam Popular at Book Fest, timesofindia.indiatimes.com. Accessed 18 January 2023.

1922 births
2013 deaths
20th-century Indian educators
20th-century Indian photographers
20th-century Indian royalty
Educators from Kerala
Maharajas of Travancore
People associated with Scouting
People from Thiruvananthapuram district
Photographers from Kerala
Sportspeople from Thiruvananthapuram